

X

X: (1986, 1996 & 2022)
X: Night of Vengeance (2011)
The X from Outer Space (1967)
X: Past Is Present (2015)
X: The Man with the X-ray Eyes (1963)
X: The Unheard Music (1986)
X-15 (1961)
X500 (2016)
X2000 (1998)
X+Y (2014)
X-Cross (2007)
The X-Files (1998)
The X-Files: I Want to Believe (2008)
X Games 3D: The Movie (2009)
X-Large (2011)
X Marks the Spot: (1931 & 1942)
X-Men series:
X-Men (2000)
X2 (2003)
X-Men: The Last Stand (2006)
X-Men Origins: Wolverine (2009)
X-Men: First Class (2011)
X-Men: Days of Future Past (2014)
X-Men: Apocalypse (2016)
X-Men: Dark Phoenix (2019)
X-Paroni (1964)
X Ray: The Inner Image (2019)
X-Ray of a Lie (2004)
X the Unknown (1956)
X Videos (2018)
X & Y (2018)
X to Y (2009)
Xagoroloi Bohudoor (1995)
Xala (1975)
Xanadu (1980)
XChange (2000)
XCU: Extreme Close Up (2001)
Xcuse Me (2003)
Xenia (2014)
Xenoa (2007)
Xenogenesis (1978)
Xero (2010)
Xero Error (2010)
The Xi'an Incident (1981)
Xiao Shan Going Home (1995)
Xiao Wu (1997)
Xica (1976)
XIII: The Conspiracy (2008)
Xime (1994)
Xingu (2011)
Xinnian Is Coming – Uproar of Chuxi (2015)
Xira (2019)
Xiu Xiu: The Sent Down Girl (1998)
XL - Extra Large (2008)
XOXO (2016)
The Xposé (2014)
XTC: This Is Pop (2017)
Xtinction: Predator X (2010)
Xtro series:
Xtro (1983)
Xtro II: The Second Encounter (1991)
Xtro 3: Watch the Skies (1995)
Xuanzang (2016)
Xuxa Abracadabra (2003)
Xuxa e os Duendes (2001)
Xuxa e os Duendes 2 - No Caminho das Fadas (2002)
Xuxa Gêmeas (2006)
Xuxa Popstar (2000)
Xuxa Requebra (1999)
Xuxa em Sonho de Menina (2007)
Xuxa e o Tesouro da Cidade Perdida (2004)
Xuxinha e Guto contra os Monstros do Espaço (2005)
XX (2017)
XX: Beautiful Beast (1995)
XX: Beautiful Hunter (1994)
XX: Beautiful Prey (1996)
XX/XY (2002)
XXL (1997)
XXX (2016)
XXX series:
XXX (2002)
XXX: State of the Union (2005)
XXX: Return of Xander Cage (2017)
XXX 4 (TBD)
xxxHolic: A Midsummer Night's Dream (2005)
XXXY (2000)
XXY (2008)
X/Y (2014)

Y

Y: (2017 & 2022)
Y Mabinogi (2003)
Y que patatín...y que patatán (1971)
Y Tu Mamá También (2001)
Y2K (1999)
YZ (2016)

Ya

Ya nunca más (1984)
Ya Rab (2014)
Ya tiene comisario el pueblo (1936)
Ya veremos (2018)
Ya Ya (2013)

Yaa

Yaaba (1989)
Yaad Rahe (1940)
Yaad Rakhegi Duniya (1992)
Yaadein (1964, 2001)
Yaadgaar: (1970 & 1984)
Yaadhavam (1993)
Yaadhumagi Nindraai (2020)
Yaadon Ki Baaraat (1973)
Yaadon Ki Kasam (1985) 
Yaakkai (2017)
Yaamirukka Bayamey (2014)
Yaan (2014)
Yaana (2019)
Yaanai Mel Kuthirai Sawaari (2016)
Yaanum Theeyavan (2017)
Yaar? (1985)
Yaar Anmulle Returns (2021)
Yaar Annmulle (2011)
Yaar Baash (2006)
Yaar Gaddar (1994)
Yaar Mera (1972)
Yaar Meri Zindagi (2008)
Yaar Nee? (1966)
Yaar Paiyyan (1957)
Yaar Pardesi (2012)
Yaara o Dildaara (2011)
Yaara Dildara (1991)
Yaara Silly Silly (2015)
Yaaradi Nee Mohini (2008)
Yaaram (2019)
Yaaran Naal Baharan (2005)
Yaarana: (1981 & 2015)
Yaare Koogadali (2012)
Yaare Neenu Cheluve (1998)
Yaarige Saluthe Sambala (2000)
Yaariyan: (2008 & 2014)
Yaaro Ezhuthiya Kavithai (1986)
Yaaron Ka Yaar (1977)
Yaaron Ki Baraat (2018)
Yaaruda Mahesh (2013)
Yaarukkaga Azhudhaan (1966)
Yaarukku Theriyum (2012)
Yaaruku Yaaro (2007)
Yaathrayude Anthyam (1989)
Yaava Janmada Maitri (1972)

Yac–Yal

Yachakan (1951)
The Yacht Isabel Arrived This Afternoon (1949)
Yacht of the Seven Sins (1928)
Yachts and Hearts, or The Opium Smugglers (1918)
Yackety Yack (1974)
The Yacoubian Building (2006)
Yad Vashem: Preserving the Past to Ensure the Future (1989)
Yadana (2006)
Yadanabon (1953)
Yadvi – The Dignified Princess (2017)
Yaen? (1970)
Yagam: (1982 & 2010)
Yagaswam (1978)
Yagavarayinum Naa Kaakka (2015)
Yagnam (1992)
Yagnam (2004)
Yagyū Ren'yasai: Hidentsuki Kageshō (1956)
Yahaan (2005)
Yahaan Sabki Lagi Hai (2015)
Yahaluvo (2007)
Yahan Ameena Bikti Hai (2016)
Yahşi Batı (2010)
Yahudi (1958)
Yahudi Ki Ladki: (1933 & 1957)
Yai Nee Romba Azhaga Irukke (2002)
Yaiskulgee Pakhang Angaoba (2012)
Yajamana: (2000 & 2019)
Yaji and Kita series:
Yaji and Kita: The Battle of Toba Fushimi (1928)
Yaji and Kita: The Midnight Pilgrims (2005)
Yaji and Kita: Yasuda's Rescue (1927)
Yajilarra (2007)
Yaju-deka (1982)
Yak: The Giant King (2012)
Yakada Pihatu (2003)
Yakeen: (1969 & 2005)
Yakov Sverlov (1940)
Yaksha: Ruthless Operations (2022)
Yakshagaanam (1976)
Yakshi (1968)
Yakshi – Faithfully Yours (2012)
Yakshi Paaru (1979)
Yakshiyum Njanum (2010)
The Yakuza (1974)
Yakuza Apocalypse (2015)
Yakuza Deka (1970)
Yakuza Graveyard (1976)
Yakuza Princess (2021)
Yakuza Weapon (2011)
Yakuza's Law: Yakuza Keibatsushi: Rinchi (1969)
Yale vs. Harvard (1927)
Yalghaar (2017)
Yalkae, a Joker in High School (1977)
Yalom's Cure (2014)
Yalu Malu Yalu 2 (2018)

Yam

Yam Daabo (1986)
Yam Yasothon (2005)
Yama Raja Siri (2018)
Yama—Attack to Attack (1985)
Yamada: The Samurai of Ayothaya (2010)
Yamagola (1977)
Yamagola Malli Modalayindi (2007)
Yamaho Yama (2012)
Yamakasi (2001)
Yamakinkarudu (1982)
Yamaleela (1994)
Yamaleela 2 (2014)
Yaman (2017)
Yamanam (1992)
Yamanukku Yaman (1980)
Yamashita: The Tiger's Treasure (2001)
Yamata (1919)
Yamata no Orochi no Gyakushū (1985)
Yamato (2005)
Yamato: The New Voyage (1979)
Yambaó (1957)
Yamini (1973)
Yamiutsu shinzo (2005)
Yamla Jat (1940)
Yamla Pagla Deewana series:
Yamla Pagla Deewana (2011)
Yamla Pagla Deewana 2 (2013)
Yamla Pagla Deewana: Phir Se (2018)
Yamraaj (1998)
Yamudiki Mogudu (1988)
Yamudiki Mogudu: Ee Nela Thakkuvodu (2012)
Yamuna (2013)

Yan

Yan Thu (2018)
Yana's Friends (1999)
Yanai Paagan (1960)
Yandé Codou, la griotte de Senghor (2008)
Yang ± Yin: Gender in Chinese Cinema (1996)
Yangtse Incident: The Story of H.M.S. Amethyst (1957)
The Yank (2014)
A Yank in Australia (1942)
A Yank on the Burma Road (1942)
A Yank Comes Back (1949)
A Yank in Ermine (1955)
A Yank at Eton (1942)
A Yank in Indo-China (1952)
A Yank in Korea (1951)
A Yank in Libya (1942)
A Yank at Oxford (1938)
A Yank in the R.A.F. (1941)
A Yank in Rome (1946)
A Yank in Viet-Nam (1964)
Yankee (1966)
Yankee Buccaneer (1952)
The Yankee Clipper (1927)
The Yankee Consul (1924)
Yankee Don (1931)
Yankee Dood It (1956)
Yankee Doodle in Berlin (1919)
Yankee Doodle Boy (1929)
Yankee Doodle Bugs (1954)
Yankee Doodle Daffy (1943)
Yankee Doodle Dandy (1942)
The Yankee Doodle Mouse (1943)
Yankee Dudler (1973)
Yankee Fakir (1947)
The Yankee Girl (1915)
A Yankee Go Getter (1921)
Yankee Pasha (1954)
Yankee Pluck (1917)
A Yankee Princess (1919)
The Yankee Señor (1926)
Yankee Speed (1924)
The Yankles (2009)
Yanks (1979)
Yanks Ahoy (1943)
The Yanks Are Coming: (1942 & 1963)
Yanky Clippers (1929)

Yap–Yay

Yaps and Yokels (1919)
The Yaqui Cur (1913)
Yaqui Drums (1956)
The Yaqui Girl (1910)
Yar Manamagan? (1961)
Yaraana (1995)
Yardie (2018)
The Yards (2000)
Yare Nee Abhimani (2000)
Yari Dushmani (1980)
Yarın Ağlayacağım (1986)
Yarınsız Adam (1976)
Yarukku Maappillai Yaro (1975)
Yarukku Sontham (1963)
Yarukkum Vetkam Illai (1975)
Yasak Aşk (1961)
Yaşam Kavgası (1978)
Yaşamak Ne Güzel Şey (1969)
Yasemin (1988)
Yash (1996)
Yashoda Krishna (1975)
Yasmin: (1955 & 2004)
Yasmina (1927)
Yasukuni (2007)
Yatchan (2015)
Yateem (1988)
Yatheem (1997)
Yathra (1985)
Yathra Chodikkathe (2016)
Yathrakarude Sradhakku (2002)
Yathrakkoduvil (2013)
Yathumaagi (2010)
Yatra: (2007 & 2019)
Yatrik (1952)
Yatterman (2009)
Yauwan (1973)
Yavanika (1982)
Yavarum Nalam (2009)
Yavvanam Katesindi (1976)
Yaya and Angelina: The Spoiled Brat Movie (2009)
Yayathi (1938)

Ye

Ye Happy Pilgrims (1934)
Ye Maaya Chesave (2010)
Ye Mantram Vesave (2013)
Ye Olde Minstrels (1941)
Ye Olden Days (1933)
Ye Re Ye Re Paisa (2018)
Ye Stupid Pyar (2011)
Ye Wooing of Peggy (1917)

Yea

Yea Toh Two Much Ho Gayaa (2016)
Yeah Right! (2003)
The Year 01 (1973)
A Year Ago in Winter (2008)
A Year Along the Abandoned Road (1991)
Year of the Carnivore (2009)
A Year and Change (2015)
Year of the Comet (1992)
Year at Danger (2007)
A Year in the Death of Jack Richards (2004)
Year of the Devil (2002)
Year of the Dog (2007)
The Year of the Dog (1994)
Year of the Dogs (1997)
The Year Dolly Parton Was My Mom (2011)
Year of the Dragon (1985)
Year of Enlightment (1986)
The Year of the Everlasting Storm (2021)
Year of the Fish (2007)
Year of Freedom. Mariupol After DNR (2015)
The Year of Getting to Know Us (2008)
Year of the Gun (1991)
A Year and a Half in the Life of Metallica (1992)
The Year of the Hare (1977)
Year of the Horse (1997)
Year of the Jellyfish (1984)
The Year of Living Dangerously (1982)
Year as Long as Life (1966)
The Year of the Mouse (1965)
The Year My Parents Went on Vacation (2006)
The Year My Voice Broke (1987)
Year of the Nail (2007)
A Year of the Quiet Sun (1984)
Year One (2009)
The Year of the Rabbit (1987)
Year by the Sea (2016)
The Year of Sir Ivor (1969)
The Year of Spectacular Men (2017)
The Year of the Tiger (2011)
A Year Toward Tomorrow (1966)
The Year We Thought About Love (2015)
A Year Without Love (2005)
The Year Without a Santa Claus: (1974 TV & 2006 TV)
The Year of the Wolf (2007)
The Year of the Yao (2004)
The Yearling: (1946 & 1994)
Yearning: (1964, 1990 & 1993)
Yearning to Belong (2007)
 Years of the Beast (1981)
The Years Between (1946)
The Years of the Locust (1916)
The Years Pass (1945)
Yeats Country (1965)

Yed–Yei

Yedanthasthula Meda (1980)
Yedi Evlat İki Damat (1973)
Yedyanchi Jatra (2012)
Yeelen (1987)
Yeh Aag Kab Bujhegi (1991)
Yeh Adam (1986)
Yeh Desh (1984)
Yeh Dil (2003)
Yeh Dil Aap Ka Huwa (2002)
Yeh Dil Aashiqanaa (2002)
Yeh Dil Kisko Doon (1963)
Yeh Dillagi (1994)
Yeh Dooriyan (2011)
Yeh Faasley (2011)
Yeh Gulistan Hamara (1972)
Yeh Hai Bakrapur (2014)
Yeh Hai Chakkad Bakkad Bumbe Bo (2003)
Yeh Hai India (2017)
Yeh Hai Jalwa (2002)
Yeh Hai Mumbai Meri Jaan (1999)
Yeh Hui Na Mardon Wali Baat (2000)
Yeh Ishq Nahin Aasaan (1984)
Yeh Jawaani Hai Deewani (2013)
Yeh Jo Mohabbat Hai (2012)
Yeh Kaisi Mohabbat (2002)
Yeh Khula Aasmaan (2012)
Yeh Kya Ho Raha Hai? (2002)
Yeh Lamhe Judaai Ke (2004)
Yeh Mera India (2008)
Yeh Mohabbat Hai (2002)
Yeh Nazdeekiyan (1982)
Yeh Raaste Hain Pyaar Ke (2001)
Yeh Raat (2000)
Yeh Raat Phir Na Aayegi: (1966 & 1992)
Yeh Rastey Hain Pyar Ke (1963)
Yeh Saali Zindagi (2011)
Yeh Sunday Kyun Aata Hai (2014)
Yeh Teraa Ghar Yeh Meraa Ghar (2001)
Yeh To Kamaal Ho Gaya (1982)
Yeh Vaada Raha (1982)
Yeh Wada Raha (2003)
Yeh Woh Manzil To Nahin (1987)
Yeh Zindagi Ka Safar (2001)
Yeh Zindagi Kitni Haseen Hai (1966)
Yehi Hai Zindagi (1977)
Yeidhavan (2017)

Yel

Yella (2007)
Yelling to the Sky (2011)
Yellow: (1998, 2006 feature, 2006 short, 2012 & 2014)
The Yellow Arm (1921)
Yellow Asphalt (2000)
The Yellow Back (1926)
The Yellow Balloon (1953)
A Yellow Bird (2016)
The Yellow Bird (2001)
The Yellow Birds (2018)
The Yellow Cab Man (1950)
Yellow Caesar (1941)
The Yellow Cameo (1928)
Yellow Canary (1943)
The Yellow Canary (1963)
Yellow Cargo (1936)
The Yellow Claw (1921) 
Yellow Contraband (1928)
Yellow Crow (1957)
The Yellow Death (1920)
The Yellow Diplomat (1920)
The Yellow Division (1954)
The Yellow Dog (1918)
Yellow Dust (1936)
Yellow Earth (1984)
Yellow Face (2010)
Yellow Fin (1951)
Yellow Fingers (1926)
The Yellow Flag (1937)
Yellow Flowers on the Green Grass (2015)
The Yellow Foal (1913)
The Yellow Handkerchief: (1977 & 2008)
Yellow Hair (1999)
Yellow Hair 2 (2001)
Yellow Hair and the Fortress of Gold (1984)
Yellow Is Forbidden (2018)
Yellow Jack (1938)
Yellow Lily (1928)
The Yellow Mask (1931)
The Yellow Mountain (1954)
The Yellow Passport (1916)
The Yellow Pawn (1916)
The Yellow Rolls-Royce (1964)
The Yellow Rose of Texas (1944)
Yellow Sands (1938)
The Yellow Sea (2010)
Yellow Sky (1948)
Yellow Star (1922)
The Yellow Star: The Persecution of the Jews in Europe 1933-45 (1980)
Yellow Sticky Notes (2007)
Yellow Stockings (1928)
Yellow Submarine (1968)
The Yellow Teddy Bears (1963)
The Yellow Ticket (1918)
The Yellow Ticket (1928)
The Yellow Tomahawk (1954)
The Yellow Typhoon (1920)
The Yellow Wallpaper (2011)
The Yellowback (1929)
Yellowbeard (1983)
Yellowbird (2014)
YellowBrickRoad (2010)
Yellowknife (2002)
Yellowneck (1955)
Yellowstone (1936)
Yellowstone Kelly (1959)
Yeltsin: Three Days in August (2011)

Yem–Yev

Yemaali (2018)
Yemaatrathe Yemaaraathe (1985)
Yemaindi Ee Vela (2010)
Yemen: The Silent War (2018)
Yenda Thalaiyila Yenna Vekkala (2018)
Yengeç Sepeti (1994)
Yennai Arindhaal (2015)
Yennamo Yedho (2014)
Yentl (1983)
The Yeomen of the Guard (1978)
Yerma (1984)
Yerma (1998)
Yerra Mandaram (1991)
Yes (2004)
Yes Boss (1997)
Yes Day (2021)
Yes Madam (2003)
Yes Man (2008)
The Yes Man (1991)
The Yes Men (2003)
The Yes Men Are Revolting (2014)
The Yes Men Fix the World (2009)
Yes, My Darling Daughter (1939)
Yes Nurse! No Nurse! (2002)
Yes Sir, Mr. Bones (1952)
Yes Sir, That's My Baby (1949)
Yes Your Honour (2006)
Yes, But... (2001)
Yes, Giorgio (1982)
Yes, God, Yes (2019)
Yes, Madam: (1933, 1942 & 1985)
Yes, Madam? (1939)
Yes, Mr Brown (1933)
Yes, My Love (1953)
Yes or No (2010)
Yes or No? (1920)
Yes, we fuck! (2015)
Yes, We Have No Bonanza (1939)
Yes, Yes, Nanette (1925)
Yes, Yes, Women Are My Weakness (1929)
Yesa (2017)
Yesenia (1971)
Yeshwant (1997)
Yessongs (1975)
Yesterday: (1959, 1981, 1985, 2002, 2004 & 2019)
Yesterday Girl (1966)
The Yesterday Machine (1963)
Yesterday Once More: (2004 & 2016)
Yesterday, Today, Tomorrow (2011)
Yesterday, Today and Tomorrow (1963)
Yesterday Was a Lie (2008)
Yesterday Was Spring (1955)
Yesterday's Enemy (1959)
Yesterday's Guys Used No Arsenic (1976)
Yesterday's Hero (1979)
Yesterday's Heroes (1940)
Yesterday's Wife (1923)
Yesteryou, Yesterme, Yesterday (1993)
Yeti Obhijaan (2017)
Yeti: Curse of the Snow Demon (2008 TV)
Yeti: Giant of the 20th Century (1977)
Yeti: A Love Story (2006)
Yeto Vellipoyindhi Manasu (2012)
Les Yeux cernés (1964)
Les Yeux jaunes des crocodiles (2014)
Yeva (2017)
Yevade Subramanyam (2015)
Yevadu (2014)

Yi–Yn

Yi Yi (2000)
A Yiddish World Remembered (2002)
Yiddle with Her Fiddle (1936)
Yield to the Night (1956)
Yıkılmayan Adam (1977)
Yin Bat Htae Ka Dar (2017)
The Yin-Yang Master: Dream of Eternity (2020)
The Yin Yang Master 2 (2003)
The Yin and the Yang of Mr. Go (1970)
The Yinyang Master (2021)
Yip Yip Yippy (1939)
Yippee (2006)
Yira, yira (1931)
Yitzhak Rabin: A Biography (2004)
Yksityisalue (1962)
Ynav Bosseba (1968)

Yo

Yo (2015)
Yo conocí a esa mujer (1942)
Yo... el aventurero (1959)
Yo Ho Ho (1981)
Yo mate a Facundo (1975)
Yo no elegí mi vida (1949)
Yo pecador (1959)
Yo quiero ser hombre (1950)
Yo quiero ser tonta (1950)
Yo soy Boricua, pa'que tu lo sepas! (2006)
Yo soy tu padre (1927)
Yo, también (2009)
Yo también tengo fiaca (1978)
Yo-Kai Watch series:
Yo-kai Watch: The Movie (2014)
Yo-kai Watch: Enma Daiō to Itsutsu no Monogatari da Nyan! (2015)
Yo-kai Watch: Soratobu Kujira to Double no Sekai no Daibōken da Nyan! (2016)
Yo-kai Watch Shadowside: Oni-ō no Fukkatsu (2017)
Yo-kai Watch: Forever Friends (2018)
Yo Yo (1965)
The Yo-Yo Gang (1992)
Yo-Yo Girl Cop (2006)

Yoa–Yot

Yoake no Machi de (2011)
Yobi, the Five Tailed Fox (2007)
Yoddha: (1992)
Yoddha: The Warrior (2009)
Yodelin' Kid from Pine Ridge (1937)
Yodeling Yokels (1931)
Yodha: (1991 & 2009)
Yodok Stories (2008)
Yoel, Israel & Pashkavils (2006)
Yoga Hakwon (2009)
Yoga Hosers (2016)
Yogamullaval (1971)
Yogera (2010)
Yogi: (2007 & 2009)
The Yogi (1916)
Yogi Bear series:
Yogi's Ark Lark (1972 TV)
Yogi's First Christmas (1980 TV)
Yogi's Great Escape (1987 TV)
Yogi Bear and the Magical Flight of the Spruce Goose (1987 TV)
Yogi and the Invasion of the Space Bears (1988 TV)
Yogi the Easter Bear (1994 TV)
Yogi Bear (2010)
Yogi Vemana (1947)
Yogiri yo Kon'yamo Arigatō (1967)
Yohan: The Child Wanderer (2010)
Yohwa Eoludong (1987)
Yojimbo (1961)
Yojōhan monogatari: Shōfu shino (1966)
Yokai Monsters series:
Yokai Monsters: 100 Monsters (1968)
Yokai Monsters: Spook Warfare (1968)
Yokai Monsters: Along with Ghosts (1969)
A Yoke of Gold (1916)
The Yoke's on Me (1944)
Yokel Boy (1942)
Yol (1982)
Yolanda (1924)
Yolanda and the Thief (1945)
Yolki series:
Yolki (2010)
Yolki 2 (2011)
Yolki 3 (2013)
Yolki 1914 (2014)
Yolki 5 (2016)
Yolki 6 (2017)
Yolki 7 (2018)
The Yolk's on You (1980)
Yolngu Boy (2001)
Yoma Paw Kya Tae Myet Yay (2019)
Yomeddine (2018)
Yomigaeri (2002)
Yona (2014)
Yona Yona Penguin (2009)
Yondiradi Kuydiradi (2011)
Yongary, Monster from the Deep (1967)
Yonggary (1999)
Yonkers Joe (2008)
Yonna in the Solitary Fortress (2006)
Yoo-Hoo, Mrs. Goldberg (2009)
Yoogan (2015)
Yor, the Hunter from the Future (1983)
Yor-yor (1964)
Yoroi Samurai Zombie (2008)
Yorokobi mo kanashimi mo ikutoshitsuki (1957)
Yoru no Kamome (1957)
Yoru no kiba (1958)
Yosemite (2015)
Yoshiwara (1920)
Yoshiwara (1937)
Yossi (2012)
Yossi & Jagger (2002)
Yotsuya Kaidan (1956)

You–Yoy

You: (2007 & 2009)
You Again (2010)
You Are Here: (2010 & 2018)
You Are on Indian Land (1969)
You Are My Home (2020)
You Are My Love (1941)
You Are My Sassy Girl (2014)
You Are My Sunshine: (2005 & 2015)
You Are Not Alone (1978)
You Are Not My Mother (2021)
You Belong to Me: (1934 & 1941)
You Can Count on Me (2000)
You Can't Always Tell (1915)
You Can't Cheat an Honest Man (1939)
You Can't Escape Forever (1942)
You Can't Get Away with Murder (1939)
You Can't Kill Stephen King (2012)
You Can't Stop the Murders (2003)
You Can't Take It With You (1938)
You Don't Know What You're Doin'! (1931)
You Don't Mess with the Zohan (2008)
You Got Served (2004)
You and I: (1938 & 2008)
You, the Living (2007)
You I Love (2004)
You, John Jones! (1943)
You Kill Me (2007)
You Know My Name (1999 TV)
You Lucky Dog (1998 TV)
You and Me: (1938 & 2005)
You, Me and Dupree (2006)
You & Me Forever (2012)
You, Me and Him: (2007 & 2017)
You and Me Are Three (1962)
You Nazty Spy! (1940)
You and the Night (2013)
You Only Live Once: (1937, 1952 & 2017)
You Only Live Twice (1967)
You Ought to Be in Pictures (1940)
You Ruined My Life (1987 TV)
You Said a Mouthful (1932)
You Should Have Left (2020)
You So Crazy (1994)
You Were Like a Wild Chrysanthemum (1955)
You Were Never Lovelier (1942)
You Were Never Really Here (2018)
You Will Be My Son (2011)
You Will Be My Wife (1932)
You Will Die at Twenty (2019)
You Will Meet a Tall Dark Stranger (2010)
You Wish! (2003 TV)
You Won't Be Alone (2022)
You, Your, Yours (2018)
You'd Be Surprised (1926)
You'd Be Surprised! (1930)
You'll Be in My Heart (1930)
You'll Find Out (1940)
You'll Get Over It (2002)
You'll Like My Mother (1972)
You'll Never Be Alone (2016)
You'll Never Get Rich (1941)
You'll Never See Me Again (1973 TV)
You're a Big Boy Now (1966)
You're Darn Tootin' (1928)
You're Dead (1999)
You're the Doctor (1938)
You're an Education (1938) 
You're Fired (1919)
You're Gonna Miss Me (2005)
You're in the Army Now (1941) 
You're in the Navy Now (1951)
You're a Lucky Fellow, Mr. Smith (1943)
You're Killing Me Susana (2016)
You're Missing the Point (1940)
You're My Boss (2015)
You're My Everything (1949)
You're My Pet (2011)
You're Never Too Young (1955)
You're Next (2011)
You're Nobody 'til Somebody Kills You (2011)
You're Not Built That Way (1936)
You're Not So Tough (1940)
You're Not You (2014)
You're the One: (1941 & 2000)
You're Only Young Once (1937)
You're Only Young Twice (1952)
You're Out of Luck (1941)
You're a Sap, Mr. Jap (1942)
You're Still the One (2015)
You're a Sweetheart (1937)
You're Telling Me (1942)
You're Telling Me! (1934)
You're Ugly Too (2015)
You're on Your Own (1959)
You've Got to Be Smart (1967)
You've Got Mail (1998)
You've Got Me By the Wing (1953)
You've Got This (2020)
You've Got to Walk It Like You Talk It or You'll Lose That Beat (1971)
Young Adam (2003)
Young Adult (2011)
The Young Ahmed (2019)
The Young Americans (1993)
The Young Animals (1968)
The Young Baron Neuhaus (1934)
Young Bess (1953)
The Young Black Stallion (2003)
Young Blood: (1926 & 1932)
The Young Blood Chronicles (2014)
Young and Dangerous series:
Young and Dangerous (1996)
Young and Dangerous 2 (1996)
Young and Dangerous 3 (1996)
Young and Dangerous 4 (1997)
Young and Dangerous 5 (1998)
Young Detective Dee: Rise of the Sea Dragon (2013)
Young Doctors in Love (1982)
Young Dr. Kildare (1938)
Young Einstein (1988)
The Young, the Evil and the Savage (1968)
Young Frankenstein (1974)
Young Friend Forever (2014)
The Young Fritz (1943)
The Young Girls of Rochefort (1967)
Young Goethe in Love (2010)
Young Guns (1988)
Young Guns II (1990)
Young at Heart: (1954, 1987 & 1995)
Young@Heart (2008)
Young Hearts: (1936, 1944 & 1953)
Young and Innocent (1937)
The Young Lieutenant (2005)
The Young Lovers: (1954 & 1964)
Young Man with a Horn (1950)
The Young Man and Moby Dick (1979)
The Young Master (1980)
The Young Messiah (2016)
Young Mr. Lincoln (1939)
Young Nowheres (1929)
The Young Nurses (1973)
The Young One: (1960 & 2016)
The Young Philadelphians (1959)
The Young Poisoner's Handbook (1995)
Young Policemen in Love (1995)
The Young Savages (1961)
Young Sherlock Holmes (1985)
Young Törless (1966)
The Young Victoria (2009)
Young Winston (1972)
Young Wives' Tale (1951)
Youngblood: (1978 & 1986)
Youngblood Hawke (1964)
Youngistaan (2014)
Your Best Friend (1922)
Your Friends & Neighbors (1998)
Your Highness (2011)
Your Lie in April (2016)
Your Name (2016)
Your Safety First (1956)
Your Sister's Sister (2011)
Your Studio and You (1996)
You're in the Army Now (1941)
Yours (2010)
Yours Emotionally (2006)
Yours, Mine, and Ours: (1968 & 2005)
Yours Truly: (2018 & 2019)
Yourself and Yours (2016)
Youth: (1917, 1922, 1934, 2002, 2013, 2015 & 2017)
Youth of the Beast (1963)
Youth of China (1937)
Youth in Revolt (2010)
Youth Takes a Fling (1938)
Youth Will Be Served (1940)
Youth Without Youth (2007)
Youvanam (1974)
Yoyes (2000)

Yp–Yv

Ypres (1925)
Yrrol (1994)
Yu (2003)
Yu-Gi-Oh! series:
Yu-Gi-Oh! (1999)
Yu-Gi-Oh! The Movie: Pyramid of Light (2004)
Yu-Gi-Oh!: Bonds Beyond Time (2010)
Yu-Gi-Oh!: The Dark Side of Dimensions (2016)
Yu Ming Is Ainm Dom (2003)
Yucatán (2018)
Yuddha Bhoomi (1988)
Yuddha Kaanda (1989)
Yuddham: (1984 & 2014)
Yuddham Sei (2011)
Yuddham Sharanam (2017)
Yuddho (2005)
Yudh (1985)
Yudhabhoomi (1976)
Yudham (1983)
Yudhpath (1992)
Yug Dekhi Yug Samma (1991)
Yuga (2006)
Yuga Purusha (1989)
Yuga Purushudu (1978)
Yugandhar (1979)
Yugant (1995)
Yuganthaya (1983)
Yugapurushan (2010)
Yugo & Lala series:
Yugo & Lala (2012)
Yugo & Lala 2 (2014)
Yugo & Lala 3 (2016)
Yuhi Kabhi (1994)
Yukon Flight (1940)
Yukon Gold (1952)
Yukon Manhunt (1951)
Yukon Vengeance (1954)
Yuma: (1971 & 2012)
Yumeji (1991)
Yummy (2019)
Yun Hota Toh Kya Hota (2006)
Yung Mung Sung (2019)
Yuppi du (1975)
The Yuppie Fantasia (1989)
The Yuppie Fantasia 3 (2017)
Yuri Nosenko: Double Agent (1986)
Yuriko's Aroma (2010)
Yuri's Day (2008)
Yuva (2004)
Yuvajanotsavam (1986)
Yuvakudu (2000)
Yuvan Yuvathi (2011)
Yuvaraja (2001)
Yuvaraju: (1982 & 2000)
Yuvataram Pilicindi (1985)
Yuvatha (2008)
Yuvatharam Kadilindi (1980)
Yuvathurki (1996)
Yuvvraaj (2008)
Yuwakusha (1989)
Yūgure made (1980)
Yves (2019)
Yves Saint Laurent (2014)
Yvette (1928)
Yvette (1938)
Yvette, the Fashion Princesss (1922)
Yvonne of the Night (1949)
Yvonne from Paris (1919)

Z

Z: (1969, 1999 & 2019)
Z Channel: A Magnificent Obsession (2004)
Z Island (2015)
Z.P.G. (1972)
Z Storm (2014)
Z for Zachariah (2015)
ZMD: Zombies of Mass Destruction (2009)
ZR-7 :The Red House Seven (2011)
ZTS: State of Entropy (2002)

Za

The Za-Bum Circus (1944)
Za co? (1995)
Za Gokiburi (1973)
Za humny je drak (1982)
Za La Mort (1924)
Za svobodu národa (1920)
Za trnkovým keřem (1980)
Za volantem nepřítel (1974)

Zaa–Zam

Zaalim (1994)
Zaat (1972)
Zabak (1961)
Zabana! (2012)
Zabardast (1985)
Zabata (1993)
Zabawka (1933)
Zabriskie Point (1970)
Zach's Ceremony (2016)
Zacharia Pothen Jeevichirippundu (2017)
Zachariah (1971)
Zack and Miri Make a Porno (2008)
Zack Snyder's Justice League (2021)
Zadar! Cow from Hell (1989)
Zadarski memento (1984)
Zagar Pyaw Thaw Athe Hnalone (1968)
Zaganella and the Cavalier (1932)
Zahreelay (1990)
Zai Jian Wo Men De Shi Nian (2015)
Zaida, the Tragedy of a Model (1923)
Zakazane piosenki (1946)
Zakham: (1989 & 1994)
Zakhm (1998)
Zakhmee (1975)
Zakhmee Insaan (1982)
Zakhmi Aurat (1988)
Zakhmi Dil: (1981 & 1994)
Zakhmi Kunku (1995)
Zakhmi Rooh (1993)
Zakhmi Sher (1984)
Zakhmi Sherni (2001)
Zakhmi Sipahi (1994)
Zakhmo Ka Hisaab (1993)
Zakhmona (2017)
Zakurozaka no Adauchi (2014)
Zalim Saudagar (1941)
Zalim Tera Jawab Nahin (1960)
Zalzala (1988)
Zalzalaa (2000)
Zalzalaa En'buri Aun (2010)
Zam Zam (TBD)
Zama (2017)
Zamaana Deewana (1995)
Zamaanat (1977)
Zamach stanu (1981)
Zamana: (1985, 1993 & 2010)
Zamane Ko Dikhana Hai (1981)
Zamane Se Kya Darna (1994)
Zamane Se Poocho (1976)
Zamani Manzil Kay Maskharay (2017)
Zamba (1949)
Zambezia (2012)
Zameen: (1943 & 2003)
Zameen Aasmaan: (1946, 1972 & 1984)
Zameen Aasman (1994)
Zameen Kay Khuda (2004)
Zameen Ke Tare (1960)
Zameer (1975)
Zameer: The Awakening of a Soul (1997)
Zameer: The Fire Within (2005)
Zamindar: (1952 & 1965)

Zan–Zaz

Zana (2019)
Zandalee (1991)
Zander the Great (1925)
La Zandunga (1938)
Zandy's Bride (1974)
Zangezur (1938)
Zangiku monogatari (1956)
Zanjeer: (1973, 1998 & 2013)
Zanna Bianca e il grande Kid (1977)
The Zany Adventures of Robin Hood (1984 TV)
Zanzibar (1940)
Zapata: The Dream of a Hero (2004)
Zapata's Gang (1914)
Los Zapaticos me Aprietan (1999)
Zapatlela (1993)
Zapatlela 2 (2013)
Zapatos Viejos (1993)
Zappa (1983)
Zappatore (1980)
Zapped (2014)
Zapped! series:
Zapped! (1982)
Zapped Again! (1990)
Zapruder film (1963)
Zara Si Zindagi (1983)
Zarak (1956)
Zardoz (1974)
Zare (1926)
Zaritsas: Russian Women in New York (2010)
Zarkorr! The Invader (1996)
Zaroorat (1972)
Zarra's Law (2014)
Zathura: A Space Adventure (2005)
Zatoichi series:
Zatoichi the Fugitive (1963)
Zatoichi on the Road (1963)
Zatoichi and the Chest of Gold (1964)
Zatoichi's Flashing Sword (1964)
Zatoichi's Revenge (1965)
Zatoichi and the Doomed Man (1965)
Zatoichi and the Chess Expert (1965)
Zatoichi's Vengeance (1966)
Zatoichi's Pilgrimage (1966)
Zatoichi's Cane Sword (1967)
Zatoichi the Outlaw (1967)
Zatoichi Challenged (1967)
Zatoichi and the Fugitives (1968)
Zatoichi Meets Yojimbo (1970)
Zatoichi Goes to the Fire Festival (1970)
Zatoichi and the One-Armed Swordsman (1971)
Zatoichi at Large (1972)
Zatoichi: (1989 & 2003)
Zatoichi: The Last (2010)
Zátopek (2021)
Zavallılar (1974)
Zaw Ka Ka Nay The (2009)
Zay El Naharda (2008)
Zaynab, la rose d'Aghmat (2014)
Zaytoun (2012)
Zaza: (1915, 1923 & 1939)
Zaza Rising (2017)
Zazel (1996)
Zazie in the Metro (1960)

Zd

Zdroj (2005)

Ze

Zea (1981)
Zeb vs. Paprika (1924)
Zebra Force (1976)
Zebra in the Kitchen (1965)
Zebra Lounge (2001)
Zebra Varakal (2017)
Zebrahead (1992)
Zebraman (2004)
Zebraman 2: Attack on Zebra City (2010)
Zed Plus (2014)
A Zed & Two Noughts (1985)
Zeder (1983)
Zee and Co. (1972)
Zeemansvrouwen (1930)
De Zeemeerman (1996)
Zeenat: (1945 & 1975)
Zegen (1987)
Zeher (2005)
Zeher-e-Ishq (TBD)
Zehreela Insaan (1974)
Zeiram (1991)
Zeisters (1986)
Zeit der Störche (1971)
Zeit der Wünsche (2005)
Zeit zu leben (1969)
Zeiten ändern dich (2010)
Zeitgeist series:
Zeitgeist: The Movie (2007)
Zeitgeist: Addendum (2008)
Zeitgeist: Moving Forward (2011)
Zelal (2010)
Želary (2003)
Zelda (1993 TV)
Zelig (1983)
Zelly and Me (1988)
Zen: (2007 & 2009)
The Zen of Bennett (2012)
The Zen Diaries of Garry Shandling (2018)
Zen Noir (2006)
Zenabel (1969)
Zenda (2010)
Zenda Swabhimanacha (2017)
Zenigata Heiji: Ghost Lord (1954)
Zenigata Heiji: Human-skin Spider (1956)
Zenith (2010)
Zenne Dancer (2012)
Zenobia (1939)
Zenon series:
Zenon: Girl of the 21st Century (1999 TV)
Zenon: The Zequel (2001 TV)
Zenon: Z3 (2004 TV)
Zephyr (2010)
Zepped (1916)
Zeppelin (1971)
Zero: (1928, 2009, 2010, 2016 & 2018)
The Zero Boys (1986)
Zero Charisma (2013)
Zero Contact (2021)
Zero for Conduct (1933)
Zero Dark Thirty (2012)
Zero Day: (2003 & 2020)
Zero Days (2016)
Zero Degree (2015)
Zero Effect (1998)
Zero Focus: (1961 & 2009)
Zero Hour: (1944 & 1977)
Zero Hour! (1957)
The Zero Hour: (1939 & 2010)
Zero Kelvin (1995)
Zero Killed (2012)
Zero Motivation (2014)
Zero Patience (1993)
Zero Point (2014)
Zero Point Five Love (2014)
Zero to Sixty (1978)
The Zero Theorem (2013)
Zero Tolerance: (1995, 1999 & 2015)
Zero Woman series:
Zero Woman: Assassin Lovers (1996)
Zero Woman: The Accused (1997)
Zero Woman: The Hunted (1997)
Zero Woman: Dangerous Game (1998)
The Zero Years (2005)
Zero: Black Blood (2014)
Zerograd (1989)
Zerophilia (2005)
Zeros and Ones (2021)
Zeroville (2019)
Zesshō (1958)
Zeta One (1969)
Zeus and Roxanne (1997)
Zevar (1942)
Zeven jongens en een oude schuit (1942)
Zeyda and the Hitman (2004)
Zeynep's Eight Days (2007)

Zh–Zn

Zhagaram (2019)
The Zhang Family's Daughter-in-Law (1985)
Z'har (2009)
Zhenya, Zhenechka and Katyusha (1967)
Zhong Kui: Snow Girl and the Dark Crystal (2015)
Zhou Yu's Train (2002)
Zhuangzi Tests His Wife (1913)
Zhukovsky (1950)
Zibahkhana (2007)
Zid: (1976 & 2014)
Zidane: A 21st Century Portrait (2006)
Ziddi: (1948, 1964, 1973 & 1997)
Ziegfeld Follies (1946)
Ziegfeld Girl (1941)
Zielen Van Napels (2005)
Zift (2008)
Zig Zag: (1970 & 2002)
Zigeunerweisen (1980)
Ziggy Stardust and the Spiders from Mars (1973)
Zigzag (1963)
The Zigzag Kid (2012)
Zigzag of Success (1968)
Zila Ghaziabad (2013)
Zim and Co. (2005)
Zimbo (1958)
Zimbo Comes To Town (1960)
Zina (1985)
Zinda (2006)
Zinda Dil: (1975 & 2003)
Zinda Laash (1967)
Zinda Lash (1932)
Zindagani (1986)
Zindaggi Rocks (2006)
Zindagi: (1940, 1964 & 1976)
Zindagi 50-50 (2013)
Zindagi Aur Toofan (1975)
Zindagi Ek Juaa (1992)
Zindagi Jalebi (2013)
Zindagi Khoobsoorat Hai (2002)
Zindagi aur Khwab (1961)
Zindagi Kitni Haseen Hay (2016)
Zindagi Na Milegi Dobara (2011)
Zindagi Tere Naam (2012)
Zindagi Zindagi (1972)
Zingara (1969)
Zingari (1920)
Zion and His Brother (2009)
Zip, the Dodger (1914)
Zip 'N Snort (1961)
Zip & Zap and the Captain's Island (2016)
Zip & Zap and the Marble Gang (2013)
Zip 'n Zoo (2008)
Zipper (2015)
Zipperface (1992)
Zipping Along (1953)
Zis Boom Bah (1941)
Zizek! (2005)
Zkouška pokračuje (1959)
Zlaté dno (1942)
Zlatna levica, priča o Radivoju Koraću (2011)
Zlatý podraz (2018)
Zlé pondělí (1960)
Zlepšovák (1960)
Zločin a trik II. (1967)
Znachor (1937)
Znaki na drodze (1970)

Zo
Zo Reken (2021)

Zod–Zol

Zodiac (2007)
The Zodiac (2005)
The Zodiac Killer (1971)
Zodiac Killers (1991)
Zodiac Rapist (1971)
Zodiac: Signs of the Apocalypse (2014)
Zodiac: The Race Begins (2006)
Zoe (2018)
Zoeken naar Eileen (1987)
Zoetrope (2011)
Zohi Sdom (2010)
Zohra (1922)
Zokkomon (2011)
Zoku Aoi sanmyaku Yukiko no maki (1957)
Zola (2020)
Zoltan, Hound of Dracula (1978)
Zolykha's Secret (2006)

Zom

Zombeavers (2014)
Zombi series:
Zombi (1978)
Zombi 2 (1979)
Zombi 3 (1988)
Zombi Child (2019)
Zombi Kampung Pisang (2007)
Zombibi (2012)
Zombie (2019)
Zombie 108 (2012)
Zombie Apocalypse (2011)
Zombie Ass: Toilet of the Dead (2011)
Zombie Bloodbath (1993)
Zombie Brigade (1986)
Zombie Chronicles (2001)
The Zombie Diaries (2008)
Zombie Dogs (2004)
The Zombie Farm (2011)
Zombie Fighters (2017)
Zombie and the Ghost Train (1991)
Zombie Girl: The Movie (2009)
Zombie High (1987)
Zombie Holidays 3D (2013)
Zombie Holocaust (1979)
Zombie Honeymoon (2004)
Zombie Hunter (2013)
Zombie Island Massacre (1984)
Zombie Killers: Elephant's Graveyard (2015)
The Zombie King (2013)
Zombie King and the Legion of Doom (2004)
Zombie Lake (1981)
Zombie Massacre (2013)
Zombie Movie (2005)
Zombie Nation (2004)
Zombie Night (2013)
Zombie Night series:
Zombie Night (2003)
Zombie Night 2: Awakening (2006)
Zombie Nightmare (1986)
Zombie in a Penguin Suit (2011)
Zombie Planet (2003)
Zombie Prom (2006 short)
Zombie Reddy (2021)
Zombie Self-Defense Force (2006)
Zombie Spring Breakers (2016)
Zombie Strippers (2008)
Zombie Undead (2010)
Zombie Wars (2006)
Zombie Women of Satan (2009)
Zombie! vs. Mardi Gras (1999)
Zombiegeddon (2003)
Zombieland (2009)
Zombieland: Double Tap (2019)
Zombies (2016)
Zombies series:
Zombies (2018 TV)
Zombies 2 (2020 TV)
Zombies 3 (2022)
Zombies on Broadway (1945)
Zombies of Mora Tau (1957)
Zombies of the Stratosphere (1952)
Zombies! Zombies! Zombies! (2008)
Zombiesthaan (2019)
Zombiez (2005)
Zombillenium (2017)
The Zombinator (2012)
Zombitopia (2021)
Zombivli (2022)

Zon–Zoz

Zona J (1998)
Zona pericolosa (1951)
Zona Roja (1976)
Zona Zamfirova (2002)
Zonad (2009)
The Zone: (2003 & 2011)
Zone 414 (2021)
Zone of the Dead (2009)
The Zone of Death (1917)
Zone Pro Site (2013)
Zone Troopers (1985)
Zontar, the Thing from Venus (1966 TV)
Zoo: (2005, 2007 & 2017)
Zoo in Budapest (1933)
The Zoo Gang (1985)
Zookeeper (2011)
The Zookeeper (2001)
The Zookeeper's Wife (2017)
Zoolander (2001)
Zoolander 2 (2016)
Zoology (2016)
Zooloo (2005)
Zoom (2006, 2015, 2016 Kannada & 2016 Sinhala)
Zoom and Bored (1957)
Zoom In: Rape Apartments (1980)
Zoom at the Top (1962)
Zoom, Zoom, Superman! (1973)
Zoombies (2016)
Zoop in Africa (2005)
Zoop in India (2006)
Zoop in South America (2007)
The Zoot Cat (1944)
Zoot Suit (1981)
Zootopia (2016)
Zor (1998)
Zor Lagaa Ke...Haiya! (2009)
Zora the Vampire (2000)
Zoran, My Nephew the Idiot (2013)
Zorawar (2016)
Zorba the Greek (1964)
Zorina (1949)
Zorns Lemma (1970)
Zorro: (1975 Italian & 1975 Hindi)
Zorro in the Court of England (1969)
Zorro Rides Again (1937)
Zorro and the Three Musketeers (1963)
Zorro's Black Whip (1944)
Zorro's Fighting Legion (1939)
Zorro, The Gay Blade (1981)
Zotz! (1962)
Zouzou (1934)
Zoya (1944)
The Zoya Factor (2019)
Zozo (2005)

Zp–Zs

Zpověď Dona Juana (1991)
Zpověď zapomenutého (2015)
Zpívající pudřenka (1959)
Zsa Zsa Zaturnnah, ze Moveeh (2006)

Zu-Zz

Zu Warriors from the Magic Mountain (1983)
Zubaan (2016)
Zubeidaa (2001)
Zübük (1980)
Zuckerkandl (1968)
Züğürt Ağa (1985)
Zugverkehr unregelmäßig (1951)
Zula Hula (1937)
Zulfiqar (2016)
Zulm Ka Badla (1985)
Zulm Ki Hukumat (1992)
Zulm Ko Jala Doonga (1988)
Zulm-O-Sitam (1998)
Zulu (1964)
Zulu (2013)
Zulu Dawn (1979)
Zulu Love Letter (2004)
Zulu Wedding (2017)
The Zulu's Heart (1908)
Zum Teufel mit der Penne (1968)
Zuma Beach (1978)
Zur Hölle mit den Paukern (1968)
Zur Sache, Macho! (2013)
Zurdo (2003)
El zurdo (1965)
Zurich (2013)
The Zurich Engagement (1957)
Zus & Zo (2001)
Zutto Mae Kara Suki Deshita (2016)
Zuzu Angel (2006)
Zvenigora (1928)
Zvezda (2002)
Zvony z rákosu (1950)
Zwei himmlische Dickschädel (1974)
Zwei Mütter (1957)
Zwischen 2 Welten (1999)
Zwischenfall in Benderath (1956)
Zygon: When Being You Just Isn't Enough (2008)
Zyzzyx Road (2006)
Zzyzx (2006)

Previous:  List of films: U–W

See also

 Lists of films
 Lists of actors
 List of film and television directors
 List of documentary films
 List of film production companies

-